Joshua Brewster Smith (February 9, 1801 – June 17, 1860) was an American politician from New York.

Life
He was the son of State Senator Joshua Smith (1763–1845) and Deborah Smith (1771–1809), and was born and died at the family estate in the Smithtown section of Hauppauge. He married Mary Rogers (1808–1878), and they had seven children, six of whom died in infancy.

He was a member of the New York State Assembly (Suffolk Co.) in 1839 and 1843.

He was a member of the New York State Senate (2nd D.) from 1844 to 1847, sitting in the 67th, 68th, 69th and 70th New York State Legislatures.

He was again a member of the State Senate (1st D.) in 1858 and 1859.

He was buried at the Hauppauge Rural Cemetery.

Sources
The New York Civil List compiled by Franklin Benjamin Hough (pages 134f, 145, 222, 228, 305 and 435; Weed, Parsons and Co., 1858)
Joshua B. Smith at Long Island Surnames

External links

The Joshua Smith House (demolished 1960),  in Smithtown by Bradley Harris, Kiernan Lannon & Joshua Ruff (Arcadia Publishing, 2009;  ; pg. 90)

1801 births
1860 deaths
People from Smithtown, New York
Democratic Party New York (state) state senators
Democratic Party members of the New York State Assembly
People from Hauppauge, New York
19th-century American politicians